Pulie Badze, is a mountain peak in Kohima District of Nagaland, standing at an elevation of  overlooking the capital city of Nagaland, Kohima, it is the centerpiece of Pulie Badze Wildlife Sanctuary.

References

 Geography of Nagaland
Kohima